The canton of Montfort-l'Amaury is a former canton of France, located in the Yvelines department. It had 44,514 inhabitants (2012). It was disbanded following the French canton reorganisation which came into effect in March 2015.

The canton comprised the following 29 communes:

Auteuil
Autouillet
Bazoches-sur-Guyonne
Béhoust
Beynes
Boissy-sans-Avoir
Flexanville
Galluis
Garancières
Goupillières
Grosrouvre
Jouars-Pontchartrain
Marcq
Mareil-le-Guyon
Méré
Les Mesnuls
Millemont
Montfort-l'Amaury
Neauphle-le-Château
Neauphle-le-Vieux
La Queue-les-Yvelines
Saint-Germain-de-la-Grange
Saint-Rémy-l'Honoré
Saulx-Marchais
Thoiry
Le Tremblay-sur-Mauldre
Vicq
Villiers-le-Mahieu
Villiers-Saint-Frédéric

References

Montfort-l'Amaury
2015 disestablishments in France
States and territories disestablished in 2015